Joy (stylized JOY) is a holiday studio album by contemporary Christian musician Steven Curtis Chapman. His fourth Christmas album and seventeenth studio album, it has seen commercial charting success, and garnered generally positive reviews from music critics.

History 

Released on October 16, 2012, Joy is Chapman's first release with Reunion Records. It is one of several Christmas albums that Chapman has done over the past few years. The album was produced by Chapman and Brent Milligan. The African Children's Choir performs on several tracks.

The cover album cover is intended to convey a 1950s styling that characterizes a number of the songs.

Music and lyrics 

Seven of the album's 13 tracks are renderings of traditional Christmas carols such as "Joy to the World" and "We Three Kings" as well as popular modern Christmas songs such as "Let It Snow! Let It Snow! Let It Snow!" and "Do You Hear What I Hear?". Chapman employs a full range of orchestration and his "trademark acoustic/pop sound" on these songs, and shows his versatility for a variety of musical arrangements on his own original compositions, including a piano ballad, slow jazz tune, and 1950s-style rockabilly.

Critical reception 

Joy received generally positive reviews from music critics. Worship Leader rated the album four-and-a-half stars and called it another classic. Brendan O'Regan of Cross Rhythms rated it eight out of ten, and stated that the songs had been given a "fresh and contemporary makeover". At Jesus Freak Hideout, Jen Rose rated it three-and-a-half stars, and wrote that it was "bright and fun and certainly lives up to its name". Jonathan Andre of Indie Vision Music, who rated the album three stars, said it was "one of [Chapman's] best", and at The Phantom Tollbooth, Michael Dalton rated it four stars, and called it "one of the best releases of the season". Joshua Andre of Christian Music Zine rated it 4.25 out of five, and wrote that it has "vulnerable, moving and pertinent songs". At CM Addict, Grace Thorson rated it four stars, and said it was "full of joy" for the holiday season.

Commercial performance 

Joy was No. 185 on the U.S. Billboard 200 album chart for December 15, 2012, and reached No. 7 on the Christian Albums chart.

Track listing

Personnel 
 Steven Curtis Chapman – lead vocals, backing vocals (1-4, 7-13), acoustic guitar (1-4, 8-12), mandolin (1, 3), percussion (1, 7), electric guitar (2, 5), guitar solo (2, 5), banjo (3), glockenspiel (4, 10), guitars (6, 7), acoustic piano (13)
 Blair Masters – acoustic piano (1, 3, 4, 5, 8-12), Hammond B3 organ, (1-4, 10, 11, 12), French horns (4), keyboards (9)
 Ben Shive – acoustic piano (6)
 Adam Lester – electric guitar (1, 2, 3, 10, 11), percussion (1), vibrato electric guitar (5), mandola (8), acoustic guitar (11, 12), baritone guitar (11)
 Brent Milligan – bass (1, 3, 4, 6, 7, 8, 10, 11, 12), arco bass (1, 4), percussion (1, 3, 8, 10), upright bass (2, 5), vibraphone (2, 5), keyboards (4), cello (7, 8, 9, 12), baritone guitar (9), electric guitar (10), glockenspiel (10, 13)
 Dan Needham – drums (1-5, 8, 10, 11, 12), percussion (1-5, 8, 10, 11, 12), cymbal swells (13)
 Danny Gottlieb – drums (6)
 Joe Causey – kalimba (1)
 Beth Gottlieb – percussion (6), jingle bells (6)
 John Mark Painter – horns (8)
 John Catchings – cello (1, 3, 4, 11)
 Kris Wilkinson – viola (1, 3, 4, 11)
 David Angell – violin (1, 3, 4, 11)
 David Davidson – violin (1, 3, 4, 11)
 The African Children's Choir 38 – choir (1, 3, 4, 8)
 Luke Brown – backing vocals (3, 11)
 Jillian Edwards – backing vocals (12)

Gang vocals on "Christmas Time Again"
 Steven Curtis Chapman, Adam Lester, Blair Masters, Brent Milligan and Dan Needham

Production 
 Producers – Steven Curtis Chapman and Brent Milligan
 A&R – Terry Hemmings and Blaine Barcus
 Recorded by Andy Hunt at Sainte Claire (Lexington, Kentucky)
 Second engineers – Tim Price and Cailon Williams
 Tracks 6 and 13 recorded by Brent Milligan at Beech Creek Studio, assisted by Robert Gay and Marty Gay; track 7 recorded at Soundwerks  (Nashville, Tennessee).
 Drums on track 3 recorded by Brent Milligan and Dan Needham at Dan's Place
 Strings recorded by Bobby Shin at Little Big Sound (Nashville, Tennessee).
 African Children's Choir recorded by Bobby Shin and Brent Milligan.
 Mixed by F. Reid Shippen at Robot Lemon (Nashville, Tennessee), assisted by Erik Jahner (1, 3, 4, 8); Shane D. Wilson at Pentavarit (Nashville, TN), assisted by Evan Redwine (2, 5, 6, 10, 11); Sean Moffitt, assisted by Warren David (7, 9, 12, 13).
 Editing and tuning – Joe Causey
 Mastered by Dave McNair at Dave McNair Mastering.
 Photography – Russ Harrington and Camille Blinn
 Wardrobe – Jonathan Powell
 Grooming – Robin Geary
 Art direction – Tim Parker and Beth Lee
 Design – Tim Parker
 A&R administration – Jenny Stika
 A&R production – Michelle Box

Charts

References 

2012 Christmas albums
Christmas albums by American artists
Steven Curtis Chapman albums
Reunion Records albums